The Croods is an American media franchise by DreamWorks Animation. The franchise began with the 2013 film The Croods, and has since grown to include a sequel, The Croods: A New Age; two television series, Dawn of the Croods and The Croods: Family Tree; and two video games. Set in the fictional prehistoric "Croodaceous" time period which is roamed by a series of bizarre hybrid animals, the franchise follows the eponymous cavepeople family as they travel through the dangerous but exotic lands in search of a new home after their previous home was destroyed.

Feature films

The Croods (2013)

The Croods is a 2013 American computer-animated adventure comedy film produced by DreamWorks Animation and distributed by 20th Century Fox, set in a fictional prehistoric Pliocene era known as "The Croodaceous" (a prehistoric period which contains fictional prehistoric creatures) when a caveman's position as a "Leader of the Hunt" is threatened by the arrival of a prehistoric genius who comes up with revolutionary new inventions as they trek through a dangerous but exotic land in search of a new home. The film was originally announced in May 2005, under the working title Crood Awakening, originally a stop motion film being made by Aardman Animations.

Chris Sanders took over development of the film in March 2007; however, development of How to Train Your Dragon postponing its original schedule for a year to a then planned March 2012. The film's final title, The Croods, was revealed in May 2009, along with new co-director, Kirk DeMicco. The film features the voices of Nicolas Cage, Emma Stone, Ryan Reynolds, Catherine Keener, Clark Duke, Cloris Leachman, and Randy Thom.

The Croods: A New Age (2020)

The Croods: A New Age is a 2020 American sequel to the 2013 film The Croods, again produced by DreamWorks Animation and distributed by Universal Pictures, following the Croods after leaving their cave in the first film as they encounter their biggest threat since leaving the cave: another family called the Bettermans.

The film was scheduled for a September 2020 release, but the release date was moved to November 25, 2020. Along with the returning cast of the first film, the film features the voices of Peter Dinklage, Leslie Mann, and Kelly Marie Tran, Tran replacing Kat Dennings.

Television series

Dawn of the Croods (2015–2017)

A 2D-animated web television series serving as a prequel to the film, titled Dawn of the Croods, aired on Netflix between December 24, 2015 and July 7, 2017. A total of 88 episodes each consisting of 2 11-minute segments were released. The cast featured new voice actors for the characters of Grug (Dan Milano), Ugga (Cree Summer), Eep (Stephanie Lemelin), Thunk (A.J. Locascio), Sandy (Grey Griffin), Gran (Laraine Newman), and Guy (Dominic Catrambone). The first three episodes were animated in Toon Boom Harmony by Vancouver's Bardel Entertainment. DreamWorks soon found that Harmony was not the best fit for animating scenes that contained multiple characters at once. The rest of the episodes were traditionally hand-drawn by South Korean studios: EMation, NE4U, and Dong Woo Animation. On July 9, 2017, executive producer Hay confirmed that the then recently-released fourth season of Dawn of the Croods had been its last.

The Croods: Family Tree (2021–present)

On August 31, DreamWorks announced a CGI animated series titled The Croods: Family Tree, based on The Croods: A New Age and will be streaming September 23rd on Hulu and Peacock. Tran reprises her role as Dawn, while A.J. Locascio reprises his role as Thunk from Dawn of the Croods. The new voice cast features, Amy Landecker as Ugga, Kiff VandenHeuvel as Grug, Ally Dixon as Eep, Artemis Pebdani as Gran, Darin Brooks as Guy, Matthew Waterson as Phil, and Amy Rosoff as Hope. Mark Banker (from Go, Dog, Go!) and Todd Grimes (from The Epic Tales of Captain Underpants) serve as executive producers and showrunners for the series.

Cast and characters
 A dark gray cell indicates the character did not appear in that installment.
 A  indicates an actor or actress voiced a younger version of their character.

Crew

Additional Crew

Reception

Box office performance

Critical and public response

Video games
A video game based on the series, titled The Croods: Prehistoric Party!, was released on March 19, 2013. Developed by Torus Games, Bandai Namco, and published by D3 Publisher, it was adapted for Wii U, Wii, Nintendo 3DS, and Nintendo DS. The game enables players to take the members of the Croods family on an adventure through 30 party style mini games. It received mainly negative reviews.

A mobile game, titled The Croods, which is a village-building game, was developed and published by Rovio, the creator of Angry Birds. It was released on March 14, 2013, to the iOS and Android platforms. It received negative reviews from critics, with Metacritic giving it a 40 out of 100.

Chronology
Chronological order of The Croods' franchise history:
 Dawn of the Croods (2015–2017)
 The Croods (2013)
 Dawn of the Croods series finale (2017)
 The Croods: A New Age (2020)
 The Croods: Family Tree (2021)

References

External links

The Croods (franchise)
Science fiction franchises
DreamWorks Animation franchises
Film franchises introduced in 2013
Evolution in popular culture
Fiction about neanderthals
Prehistoric life in popular culture
Animated film series
Children's film series